Asenso Manileño Movement is a local political party in Manila. It is the city's ruling party since 2019, being in dominion through the administrations of mayors Isko Moreno and Honey Lacuna.

History 
The party was established in 2005 by Moreno's mentor, Danny Lacuna, the vice mayor of Manila at that time. The party's signature hand gesture is pointing the index finger upward which means "God first", the party's slogan. The party managed Moreno's successful vice mayoral campaign in the 2013 election, despite carrying then Mayor Joseph Estrada's United Nationalist Alliance. In 2018, Moreno decided to challenge Estrada for the mayoralty in the 2019 elections. Moreno won the election and his allies then controlled a majority of seats in the Manila City Council.

The National Unity Party then took on the party as its local affiliate in August 2019, with Moreno being named as one of its vice chairmen. In 2021, the party changed its national affiliation to the progressive Aksyon Demokratiko with Moreno being named its national president.

In the 2022 elections, the party attained a historic success. It won 34 of the 36 elective seats in the city council, as well as maintaining the mayoralty and vice mayoralty. Additionally, all six congressional elections were won by candidates allied with the party.

Electoral performance

Mayoral and Vice Mayoral elections

City Council elections

House of Representatives elections

References 

2005 establishments in the Philippines
Political parties in Metro Manila
Politics of Manila
Political parties established in 2005
Regionalist parties in the Philippines